HD 194953 (HR 7824) is a solitary star in the equatorial constellation Delphinus. It is faintly visible to the naked eye with an apparent magnitude of 6.19 and is located 414 light years away.

HD 194953 has a stellar classification of G8 III/IV — a blended luminosity class of a subgiant and giant.

References

Delphinus (constellation)
G-type giants
G-type subgiants
Delphini, 6
BD +02 04175
194953
100969
7824
High-proper-motion stars